Eupithecia meandrata is a moth in the family Geometridae. It is found in Libya.

References

Moths described in 1924
meandrata
Moths of Africa